Multitude is an American podcast collective, studio, and ad sales provider based in Brooklyn, New York. Established in 2018 by CEO Amanda McLoughlin and run by McLoughlin, Head of Creative Eric Silver, and Head of Production Brandon Grugle, the company specializes in the production of conversational-style podcasts and community-oriented programming. In early 2023, Multitude partnered with Defector to run their flagship sports show, The Distraction. As of 2022, Multitude's total podcast downloads are estimated in the hundreds of millions.

History

Multitude was established in 2018 by Amanda McLoughlin based on a business plan developed by McLoughlin and Eric Silver. In May 2019, Multitude opened an office in Greenpoint, Brooklyn.  In November 2019, the company announced the opening of its studio, and in October 2020, it announced a partnership with Sony Music for the production of the podcast "My 90s Playlist". In January 2022, Multitude announced a partnership with Netflix for the production of the podcast "Homo Schedule".

The company's first annual Multitude Podcasting Conference took place in September 2022.

Business model
Multitude has multiple lines of business: the creation, production, and community events of the podcast collective's “member shows;” studio production and consulting for other clients; and ad sales for both member shows and other clients. Eric Silver said, “The company has two arms… one arm is the collective shows themselves…The other side is the studio.”

Multitude provides ad sales for a variety of other podcasts, including The Allusionist, "You Are Good", "Nocturne", "Imaginary Worlds", "The Bright Sessions", "Flash Forward", "It’s Super Effective", "Shedunnit", "Startripper!!", and "Rude Tales of Magic".

The company also offers education and consulting services, and has taught and performed at numerous conferences and venues across the United States, including PodCon, Podcast Movement, PODX, She Podcasts, Sound Education, Patrecon, Hot Pod Summit, and live shows in cities such as NYC, Boston, Portland, Seattle, Los Angeles, and Austin. Multitude's consulting work includes various projects such as WFMT's Bughouse Square in June 2018.

Current programming

Shows overview

Past, limited, and hiatus shows
Multitude has produced several limited series for production partners, including Sony Music's “My 90s Playlist” and Netflix's The Homo Schedule. There are various shows on hiatus including “Waystation,” a recap show about the Canadian show “Lost Girl,” the audio fiction sitcom “Next Stop,” and Nichole Perkins’ podcast about not having guilty pleasures “This Is Good for You.” Past shows also include “Potterless,” “Horse” and “Meddling Adults.”

Staff

As of 2023 Multitude's executive staff is Head of Creative Eric Silver, Head of Production Brandon Grugle, and CEO Amanda McLoughlin. Employees are Community Manager Roux Bedrosian, Ad Operations Assistant Carly Gerard, and Senior Audio Editor Mischa Stanton. Hosts are Founding Members Julia Schifini and Eric Schneider, as well as Moiya McTier, Corinne Caputo, Jazza John, and Rowan Ellis.

References

External links
 Official Website
 Multitude and the Pandemic
 On sustainability and engagement in podcasting
 Profile of co-founder Amanda McLoughlin

American podcasts
Audio podcasts
Video podcasts
Podcasting companies
Companies based in New York City